This is a list of Regions of Moldova by Human Development Index as of 2021.

References 

Moldova
Belarus
Human Development Index